Rita Jones is a former Welsh international lawn and indoor bowler.

Bowls career
In 1985 Jones won a triples bronze medal at the 1985 World Outdoor Bowls Championship in Preston, Victoria, Melbourne, Australia.

She won the gold medal in the fours at the 1986 Commonwealth Games in Edinburgh, a silver medal at the 1994 Commonwealth Games and a bronze medal in the pairs with Ann Sutherland at the 1998 Commonwealth Games in Kuala Lumpur.

Jones has won four medals at the Atlantic Bowls Championships including a gold medal in the triples at the 1993 inaugural tournament in Florida.

Jones has also won the 15 National indoor singles titles; five singles in 1979, 1984, 1986, 1991 and 1992, the pairs in 1993, the triples four times and fours on five occasions.

References

Living people
Bowls players at the 1986 Commonwealth Games
Bowls players at the 1990 Commonwealth Games
Bowls players at the 1994 Commonwealth Games
Bowls players at the 1998 Commonwealth Games
Commonwealth Games medallists in lawn bowls
Welsh female bowls players
Commonwealth Games gold medallists for Wales
Commonwealth Games silver medallists for Wales
Commonwealth Games bronze medallists for Wales
1938 births
Medallists at the 1986 Commonwealth Games
Medallists at the 1994 Commonwealth Games
Medallists at the 1998 Commonwealth Games